In abstract algebra, Kaplansky's theorem on projective modules, first proven by Irving Kaplansky, states that a projective module over a local ring is free; where a not-necessarily-commutative ring is called local if for each element x, either x or 1 − x is a unit element. The theorem can also be formulated so to characterize a local ring (#Characterization of a local ring).

For a finite projective module over a commutative local ring, the theorem is an easy consequence of Nakayama's lemma. For the general case, the proof (both the original as well as later one) consists of the following two steps:
Observe that a projective module over an arbitrary ring is a direct sum of countably generated projective modules.
Show that a countably generated projective module over a local ring is free (by a "[reminiscence] of the proof of Nakayama's lemma").

The idea of the proof of the theorem was also later used by Hyman Bass to show big projective modules (under some mild conditions) are free.

Proof 
The proof of the theorem is based on two lemmas, both of which concern decompositions of modules and are of independent general interest.

Proof: Let N be a direct summand; i.e., . Using the assumption, we write  where each  is a countably generated submodule. For each subset , we write  the image of  under the projection  and  the same way. We give this set a partial ordering such that  if and only if , . By Zorn's lemma, the set contains a maximal element . We shall show that ; i.e., . Suppose otherwise. Then we can inductively construct a sequence of at most countable subsets  such that  and for each integer ,
.
We claim:

The inclusion  is trivial. Hence,  the claim is valid.

Then, by modular law, . Set . Define  in the same way. Then, using the early claim, we have:

which implies that

Proof: Let  denote the family of modules that are isomorphic to modules of the form  for some finite subset . The assertion is then implied by the following claim:
Given an element , there exists an  that contains x and is a direct summand of N.
Indeed, assume the claim is valid. Then choose a sequence  in N that is a generating set. Then using the claim, write  where . Then we write  where . Note . Repeating this argument, in the end, we have: ; i.e., . Hence, the proof reduces to proving the claim and the claim is a straightforward consequence of Azumaya's theorem (see the linked article for the argument). 

Proof of the theorem: Let  be a projective module over a local ring. Then, by definition, it is a direct summand of some free module . This  is in the family  in Lemma 1; thus,  is a direct sum of countably generated submodules, each a direct summand of F and thus projective. Hence, without loss of generality, we can assume  is countably generated. Then Lemma 2 gives the theorem.

Characterization of a local ring 
Kaplansky's theorem can be stated in such a way to give a characterization of a local ring. A direct summand is said to be maximal if it has an indecomposable complement.

The implication  is exactly (usual) Kaplansky's theorem and Azumaya's theorem. The converse  follows from the following general fact, which is interesting itself:

Conversely, suppose  has the above property and that an element x in R is given. Consider the linear map . Set . It follows easily from that the assumption that either x or -y is a unit element.

See also 
Krull–Schmidt category

Notes

References 

H. Bass: Big projective modules are free, Illinois J. Math. 7(1963), 24-31.
 
 Y. Lam, Bass’s work in ring theory and projective modules [MR 1732042]
 

Theorems in ring theory
Module theory